Messier 30 (also known as M30 or NGC 7099) is a globular cluster of stars in the southeast of the southern constellation of Capricornus, at about the declination of the sun when the latter is at December solstice. It was discovered by the French astronomer Charles Messier in 1764, who described it as a circular nebula without a star. In the New General Catalogue, compiled during the 1880s, it was described as a "remarkable globular, bright, large, slightly oval." It can be easily viewed with a pair of 10×50 binoculars, forming a patch of hazy light some 4 arcminutes wide that is slightly elongated along the east–west axis. With a larger instrument, individual stars can be resolved and the cluster will cover an angle of up to 12 arcminutes across graduating into a compressed core about one arcminute wide that has further star density within. 

It is longest observable (opposed to the sun) in the first half of August.

M30 is centered 27,100 light-years away from Earth with a roughly 2.5% margin of error, and is about 93 light-years across. The estimated age is roughly 12.9 billion years and it forms a mass of about 160,000 times the mass of the Sun. The cluster is following a retrograde orbit (against the general flow) through the inner galactic halo, suggesting that it was acquired from a satellite galaxy rather than forming within the Milky Way. It is in this epoch , from the center of the galaxy, compared to an estimated  for the Sun.

The cluster has passed through a dynamic process called core collapse and now has a concentration of mass at its core of about a million times the Sun's mass per cubic parsec. This makes it one of the highest density regions in the Milky Way galaxy. Stars in such close proximity will experience a high rate of interactions that can create binary star systems, as well as a type of star called a blue straggler that is formed by mass transfer. A process of mass segregation may have caused the central region to gain a greater proportion of higher mass stars, creating a color gradient with increasing blueness toward the middle of the cluster.

See also
 List of Messier objects

References and footnotes

External links

 Globular Cluster M30 @ SEDS Messier pages
 Messier 30, Galactic Globular Clusters Database page
 
 

Messier 030
Messier 030
030
Messier 030
17640803
August events